Sweet Dreams is a series of over 230 numbered, stand-alone teen romance novels that were published from 1981-1996. Written by mostly American writers, notable authors include Barbara Conklin, Janet Quin-Harkin, Laurie Lykken, Marilyn Kaye (writing under the pseudonym Shannon Blair), and Yvonne Greene.

Each teen novel dealt with common high school drama and romance themes, including first dates, first love, and conflicts. It was through these books that the major teen book series Sweet Valley High was launched.

Cover designs used photographs of models similar to each novel's heroine's description. The cover of The Last Word featured Courteney Cox.

Works
This list is work-in-progress, more will be added as information becomes available.

Sweet Dreams 

 P.S. I Love You - Barbara Conklin
 The Popularity Plan - Rosemary Vernon
 Laurie's Song  - Suzanne Rand
 Princess Amy - Melinda Pollowitz
 Little Sister  - Yvonne Green
 California Girl  - Janet Quin-Harkin
 Green Eyes - Suzanne Rand
 The Thoroughbred - Joanne Campbell
 Cover Girl - Yvonne Green
 Love Match - Janet Quin-Harkin
 The Problem With Love - Rosemary Vernon
 Night Of The Prom - Debra Spector
 The Summer Jenny Fell in Love - Barbara Conklin
 Dance Of Love  - Jocelyn Saal
 Thinking of You  - Jeanette Nobile
 How Do You Say Goodbye? - Margaret Burman
 Ask Annie  - Suzanne Rand
 Ten-Boy Summer - Janet Quin-Harkin
 Love Song  - Anne Park
 The Popularity Summer - Rosemary Vernon
 All's Fair in Love  - Jeanne Andrews
 Secret Identity  - Joanna Campbell
 Falling in Love Again - Barbara Conklin
 The Trouble With Charlie  - Jaye Ellen
 Her Secret Self  - Rhondi Willot
 It Must Be Magic - Marian Woodruff
 Too Young for Love  - Gailanne Maravel
 Trusting Hearts  - Jocelyn Saal
 Never Love A Cowboy - Jesse DuKore
 Little White Lies - Lois I. Fisher
 Too Close for Comfort - Debra Spector
 Daydreamer - Janet Quin-Harkin
 Dear Amanda  - Rosemary Vernon
 Country Girl - Melinda Pollowitz
 Forbidden Love - Marian Woodruff
 Summer Dreams  - Barbara P. Conklin
 Portrait of Love - Jeanette Nobile
 Running Mates  - Jocelyn Saal
 First Love - Debra Spector
 Secrets  - Anna Aaron
 The Truth About Me & Bobby V. - Janetta Johns
 Perfect Match  - Marian Woodruff
 Tender Loving Care  - Anne Park
 Long Distance  - Jesse Dukore
 Dream Prom - Margaret Burman
 On Thin Ice  - Jocelyn Saal
 Te Amo Means I Love You - Deborah Kent
 Dial L for Love  - Marian Woodruff
 Too Much to Lose - Suzanne Rand
 Lights, Camera, Love  - Gailanne Maravel
 Magic Moments  - Debra Spector
 Love Notes - Joanna Campbell
 Ghost Of A Chance - Janet Quin-Harkin
 I Can't Forget You  - Lois I. Fisher
 Spotlight On Love - Nancy Pines
 Campfire Nights  - Dale Cowan
 On Her Own - Suzanne Rand
 Rhythm Of Love - Stefanie Foster
 Please Say Yes - Alice O. Crawford
 Summer Breezes - Susan Blake
 Exchange Of Hearts  - Janet Quin-Harkin
 Just Like The Movies  - Suzanne Rand
 Kiss Me, Creep - Marian Woodruff
 Love In The Fast Lane - Rosemary Vernon
 The Two Of Us  - Janet Quin-Harkin
 Love Times Two - Stephanie Foster
 I Believe In You - Barbara P. Conklin
 Lovebirds  - Janet Quin-Harkin
 Call Me Beautiful - Shannon Blair
 Special Someone  - Terri Fields
 Too Many Boys  - Celia Dickenson
 Goodbye Forever  - Barbara P. Conklin
 Language Of Love - Rosemary Vernon
 Don't Forget Me  - Diana Gregory
 First Summer Love - Stephanie Foster
 Three Cheers for Love - Suzanne Rand
 Ten-Speed Summer - Deborah Kent
 Never Say No - Jean F. Capron
 Star Struck! - Shannon Blair
 A Shot at Love - Jill Jarnow
 Secret Admirer - Debra Spector
 Hey, Good Looking!  - Jane Polcovar
 Love by the Book - Anne Park
 The Last Word  - Susan Blake
 The Boy She Left Behind - Suzanne Rand
 Questions of Love - Rosemary Vernon
 Programmed for Love - Marion Crane
 Wrong Kind of Boy - Shannon Blair
 101 Ways to Meet Mr. Right  - Janet Quin-Harkin
 Two's A Crowd  - Diana Gregory
 The Love Hunt  - Yvonne Greene
 Kiss and Tell  - Shannon Blair
 The Great Boy Chase - Janet Quin-Harkin
 Second Chances - Nancy Levinson
 No Strings Attached - Eileen Hehl
 First, Last, and Always - Barbara P. Conklin
 Dancing in The Dark - Carolyn Ross
 Love Is In The Air  - Diana Gregory
 One Boy Too Many - Janet Quin-Harkin
 Follow That Boy  - Marian Caudell
 Wrong for Each Other  - Deborah Spector
 Hearts Don't Lie - Terri Fields
 Cross My Heart - Diana Gregory
 Playing for Keeps - Janice Stevens
 The Perfect Boy  - Elizabeth Reynolds
 Mission: Love  - Kathryn Makris
 If You Love ME - Barbara Steiner
 One of the Boys  - Jill Jarnow
 No More Boys - Charlotte White
 Playing Games  - Eileen Hehl
 Stolen Kisses  - Elizabeth Reynolds
 Listen To Your Heart  - Marian Caudell
 Private Eyes - Julia Winfield
 Just The Way You Are  - Janice Boies
 Promise Me Love  - Jane Redish
 Heartbreak Hill  - Carol MacBain
 The Other Me - Terri Fields
 Heart to Heart - Stefanie Curtis
 Star-Crossed Love - Sharon Cadwallader
 Mr. Wonderful  - Fran Michaels
 Only Make-Believe - Julia Winfield
 Star In Her Eyes - Dee Daley
 Love in the Wings - Virginia Smiley
 More Than Friends - Janice Boies
 Parade of Hearts - Jahnna Beecham
 Here's My Heart  - Stefanie Curtis
 My Best Enemy  - Janet Quin-Harkin
 One Boy at a Time - Diana Gregory
 A Vote For Love  - Terri Fields
 Dance with Me  - Jahnna Beecham
 Hand Me Down Heart  - Mary Schultz
 Winner Takes All - Laurie Lykken
 Playing the Field - Eileen Hehl
 Past Perfect - Fran Michaels
 Geared for Romance  - Shan Finney
 Stand By For Love - Carol Macbain
 Rocky Romance  - Sharon Dennis Wyeth
 Heart and Soul - Janice Boies
 The Right Combination - Jahnna Beecham
 Love Detour  - Stefanie Curtis
 Winter Dreams  - Barbara Conklin
 Lifeguard Summer - Jill Jarnow
 Crazy For You  - Jahnna Beecham
 Priceless Love - Laurie Lykken
 This Time For Real  - Susan Gorman
 Gifts From The Heart  - Joanne Simbal
 Trust in Love  - Shan Finney
 Riddles of Love  - Judy Baer
 Practice Makes Perfect  - Jahnna Beecham
 Summer Secrets - Susan Blake
 Fortunes of Loves - Mary Schultz
 Cross Country Match - Ann Richards
 The Perfect Catch - Laurie Lykken
 Love Lines - Frances H. Grimes
 The Game of Love - Susan Gorman
 Two Boys Too Many - Janet Adele Bloss
 Mr Perfect - Stefanie Curtis
 Crossed Signals  - Janice Boies
 Long Shot  - Joanne Simbal
 Blue Ribbon Romance - Virginia Smiley
 My Perfect Valentine  - Judy Baer
 Trading Hearts - Susan Blake
 My Dream Guy - Carla Bracale
 Playing To Win - Janice Boies
 A Brush With Love - Stephanie St. Pierre
 Three's A Crowd  - Alison Dale
 Working At Love  - Judy Baer
 Dream Date - Carla Bracale Cassidy
 Golden Girl  - Jane Ballard
 Rock 'N' Roll Sweetheart  - Laurie Lykken
 Acting On Impulse - Susan Jo Wallach
 Sun Kissed - Stephanie St Pierre
 Music From The Heart  - Pamela Laskin
 Love On Strikes  - Janice Boies
 Puppy Love - Carla Bracale
 Wrong-Way Romance - Sheri Cobb South
 The Truth About Love  - Laurie Lykken
 Project Boyfriend - Stephanie St Pierre
 Racing Hearts  - Susan Sloate
 Opposite Attracts - Linda Joy Singleton
 Time Out of Love - June O'Connell
 Down With Love - Carla Bracale Cassidy
 The Real Thing - Elisabet McHugh
 Too Good To Be True - Susan E. Kirby
 Focus on Love  - Mandy Anson
 That Certain Feeling  - Sherri Cobb South
 Fair-Weather Love - Carla Bracale Cassidy
 Play Me A Love Song - Bette Headapohl
 Cheating Heart - Laurie Lykken
 Almost Perfect - Linda Joy Singleton
 Backstage Romance - Kelly Kroeger
 The Cinderella Game - Sheri Cobb South
 Love in the Upbeat  - June O'Connell
 Lucky in Love  - Eileen Hehl
 Comedy of Errors - Diane Michele Crawford
 Clashing Hearts  - Caryn Jenner
 The News Is Love - Lauren M. Phelps
 Partners In Love - Susan E. Kirby
 Wings of Love  - Anne Herron Wolfe
 Love to Spare  - Linda Joy Singleton 
 His and Hers - June O'Connell
 Love On Wheels - Sandy Jones
 Lesson in Love - Bette Headapohl
 Picture Perfect Romance - J. B. Cooper
 Cowboy Kisses  - Diane Michele Crawford
 Moonlight Melody - Alicyn Watts
 My Secret Heart  - Susan E. Kirby
 Romance on the Run  - Catt Hastings
 Weekend Romance  - Peggy Teeters
 Oh, Promise Me - Laurie Lykken
 Dreamskate - Angela Cash
 Highland Hearts  - Maggie Hayes
 Finders keepers  - Jan Washburn
 Don't Bet On Love - Sheri Cobb South
 Deep In My Heart - Linda Joy Singleton 
 Careless Whispers - Sydell Voeller
 Head Over Heels - Susan Sloate
 Face Up To Love  - Nikki Danner
 Heartstrings - Barbara Wilson
 My Funny Guy - Helen Santori
 A Little More To Love - Arlene Erlbach
 Fool For Love  - Sandy Jones
 Hearthrob  - Betty Jo Schuler
 Boyfriend Blues  - Lauren M. Phelps
 Recipe For Love  - Kate Emburg
 Aloha Love - Marcie Kremer
 Dreamboat  - Linda Joy Singleton 
 Blame It On Love - Sheri Cobb South
 Rich In Romance  - Angela Cash
 Happily Ever After  - Eileen Hehl
 Love Notes - Janet Maxwell
 The Love Line  - Kelly Kroeger
 Follow Your Heart - Bette Headapohl

Sweet Dreams Specials

Fiction 
 My Secret Love - Janet Quin-Harkin
 A Change of Heart - Susan Blake
 Searching For Love  - Andrea Warren
 Taking The Lead  - Deborah Kent
 Never Say Goodbye - Janet Quin-Harkin
 Chance to Love - Stephanie Foster

Nonfiction 
 The Sweet Dreams Love Book: Understanding Your Feelings - Deidre S. Laiken and Alan J. Schneider
 The Sweet Dreams Body Book: A Guide to Diet, Nutrition, and Exercise - Julie Davis
 The Sweet Dreams Beautiful Hair Book: A Guide to Hair Care, Cuts and Styles - Courtney DeWitt
 Sweet Dreams: How To Talk To Boys And Other Important People - Catherine Winters
 The Sweet Dreams Fashion Book: Looking Hot Without Spending A Lot - Patricia Bozic

On Our Own 
Series by Janet Quin-Harkin.
 The Graduates
 The Trouble With Toni
 Out of Love
 Old Friends, New Friends
 Growing Pains
 Best Friends Forever

Private Eyes 
Series by Julia Winfield.
 Partners in Crime
 Tug of Hearts
 On Dangerous Ground

Winners 
Series by Suzanne Rand.
 The Girl Most Likely
 All-American Girl
 The Good Luck Girl

References

Young adult novel series
Romance novel series
Young adult romance novels